Lieutenant General Taranjit Singh, AVSM, VSM*, is the current Dy Chief of Integrated Defence Staff (Operations) previously he was General Officer Commanding I Corps of the Indian Army.

Early life and education 
He is an alumnus of National Defence Academy.

Career 
He was commissioned into 65th Armoured Regiment on 19 December 1981. He has special experience in mechanised warfare and operational art. He was part of the Indian Peacekeeping Force during Operation Pawan. He has held numerous commands including an armoured brigade and a Rapid Division which is part of a Strike Corps. He has also held staff appointments at the Army HQ and United Nations peacekeeping missions. He was General Officer Commanding I Corps of the Indian Army from 29 December 2017 to 31 January 2019. He assumed the post from Lt General Ranbir Singh.

During his career, he has been awarded the Vishisht Seva Medal twice (2016 and 2017) for his service  and the Ati Vishisht Seva Medal in 2019.

Honours and decorations

References 

Living people
Indian generals
Indian Army officers
Year of birth missing (living people)
Recipients of the Ati Vishisht Seva Medal
Recipients of the Vishisht Seva Medal